Daunian pottery was produced in the Daunia, today's Italian provinces of Barletta and Foggia. It was created by the Daunians, a tribe of the Iapygian civilization who had come from Illyria.

Daunian pottery was mainly produced in the regional production centers of Ordona and Canosa di Puglia, beginning around 700 BC. The early paintings on the pottery show the vessels with geometric patterns. The ceramics were hand-formed, rather than thrown on a potter's wheel. They consisted of red, brown or black earth color applied with the decor. Diamonds, triangles, circles, crosses, squares, arcs, swastika and other forms of art were painted on them. The development of Daunian pottery forms is independent of the first Greek ceramics. Typical Daunian pottery include the Askos, hopper vessels and bowls with loop handles. Striking are often manual, or anthropomorphic protomen to the sides and handles of the ceramics attached to or reproduced graphically.

From the 5th century BC, Daunian pottery is influenced by the Greek forms to an extent that crude human, bird and plant figures are depicted on the pottery. From 350 BC-250 BC the decorative forms change even further.

See also
Illyrians
Messapian pottery
Peucetian pottery

References

Illyrian pottery
Italian pottery